{{Infobox person
| honorific_prefix          =
| name                      = Gloria Amescua
| honorific_suffix          =
| image                     =
| image_upright             =
| image_size                = 
| alt                       =
| caption                   =
| native_name               =
| native_name_lang          =
| pronunciation             =
| birth_name                = 
| birth_date                = 
| birth_place               = Austin, Texas
| baptised                  = 
| disappeared_date          = 
| disappeared_place         =
| disappeared_status        =
| death_date                = 
| death_place               =
| death_cause               =
| body_discovered           =
| resting_place             =
| resting_place_coordinates = 
| burial_place              = 
| burial_coordinates        = 
| monuments                 =
| nationality               = Mexican American
| other_names               =
| citizenship               = American
| education                 = B.A., Masters of Education
| alma_mater                = University of Texas at Austin
| occupation                = Writer, poet, educator
| years_active              =
| era                       =
| employer                  =
| agent                     = 
| known_for                 =
| notable_works             = ': "Windchimes"; and "What Remains"
| style                     =
| height                    = 
| television                =
| title                     =
| term                      =
| predecessor               =
| successor                 =
| party                     =
| movement                  =
| opponents                 =
| boards                    =
| criminal_charge           = 
| criminal_penalty          =
| criminal_status           =
| spouse                    = 
| partner                   = 
| children                  =
| parents                   = 
| mother                    = 
| father                    = 
| relatives                 =
| family                    =
| callsign                  =
| awards                    =
| website                   = 
| module                    =
| module2                   =
| module3                   =
| module4                   =
| module5                   =
| module6                   =
| signature                 =
| signature_size            =
| signature_alt             =
| footnotes                 = 
}}Gloria Amescua' is a Latina and Tejana writer from Austin, Texas. Her most recent book is CHILD OF THE FLOWER-SONG PEOPLE: LUZ JIMÉNEZ, DAUGHTER OF THE NAHUA, a picture book biography illustrated by Duncan Tonatiuh and published by Abrams books for Young Readers, 2021. Her enjoyment of writing stories and poems as a child prompted her to publish many poems, manuscripts, and chapbooks throughout her life. After receiving her B.A. and Masters of Education from University of Texas at Austin, she went on to win first place at the 2013 Austin International Poetry Festival Contest and the Austin Poetry Society Award. She is now a workshop presenter for youth and adults, and is an active alumna of Hedgebrook's Writers-in-Residence program.  Amescua is most known for her poetry chapbook entitled "Windchimes" and "What Remains." She won Lee and Low's Honor Award (2016) for her picture book manuscript in verse originally titled: Luz Jiménez, No Ordinary Girl. She now resides in Austin and continues to earn awards for her culturally vibrant poetry and prominence in the Texas Latinx community.

 Early life 
Amescua was born in Austin, Texas.  Her father was born in Michoacán, Mexico. Her mother was Mexican American. Her dual identity as a Latina and Tejana helped to mold the major themes present throughout Amescua's poetry and manuscripts. She writes beautifully what she knows: poems about her family and beyond. She also wrote a picture book manuscript through the lens of her character Luz Jiménez, a Nahua educator and art muse living in Mexico, which won the 2016 New Visions Honor Award. She continues to write poetry and picture books.

 Career 
Amescua went on to earn a bachelor's degree and Masters of Education from UT at Austin, and worked for some years in education as an English teacher. She also became a high school assistant principal and the Secondary Language Arts Curriculum Director for a large school district in Texas. She has since been published in a variety of books as well as print and online journals. Her excellence in writing has earned many prestigious awards, including the Austin Poetry Society Award and the Christina Sergeyevna Award for poetry. She most recently was chosen among hundreds of writers to receive the Lee and Low 2016 New Voices Award Honor for her poetry manuscript, Luz Jiménez, No Ordinary Girl. She is an inaugural member of CantoMundo, a national Latinx poetry community. She has often attributed her work with this group as a cause of her continued growth as a poet and a Latina. Additionally, she has made significant contributions to the Society of Children’s Book Writers and Illustrators’ Austin Chapter, of which she is a salient member.

 Publications Acentos Review (2012); Texas Poetry Calendar (2013); di-verse-city (2000-2016); Kweli Journal (2014); Generations Literary Journal (2011); Texas Poetry Calendar (2013-2016); Pilgrimage Magazine (2014); Lifting the Sky Southwestern Haiku & Haiga (2010); Bearing the Mask: Southwestern Persona Poems (2016); The Crafty Poet II: A Portable Workshop (2016); Entre Guadalupe y Malinche: Tejanas in Literature and Art (2016)

 Analysis 
Unsurprisingly, Amescua’s written work heavily features Latinx themes, as told either through her own eyes as she views her family members, or through the lens of a biographical character. Her most recent book, CHILD OF THE FLOWER-SONG PEOPLE: LUZ JIMÉNEZ, DAUGHTER OF THE NAHUA, features a Nahua woman who overcomes various cultural obstacles through her experience as a teacher and art muse in Mexico. Luz, meaning "light" in Spanish, eventually serves, through her teaching, as a link between the Aztecs and her Nahua culture.  Although not autobiographical, one can draw many links to Amescua and Luz's similar spirits.

Happily, Amescua's themes are, more often than not, positive messages about the life of a Tejana and one's ability to achieve dreams with hard work and compassion.  She dedicates many of her poems to her mother, a woman whom she clearly admires and adores.  In her poem, "Fall into the Fig," featured in the book Entre Guadalupe y Malinche: Tejanas in Literature and Art, she characterizes her mother as: “More than an uneducated ‘Mexican’. . . / More than a laundress and a cook in the schools / More than our father’s wife and our mother / always a fire of possibility” (69). This passage exemplifies Amescua’s faith in her mother and her belief of the possibility of a different life for her.

 References 

Sources
 Hernández-Ávila, Inés, and Norma Elia Cantú, eds. Entre Guadalupe Y Malinche: Tejanas in Literature and Art''. Austin: U of Texas, 2016. Print.
 "Society of Children's Book Writers and Illustrators The International Professional Organization for Writers and Illustrators of Children's Literature." SCBWI Texas-Austin. N.p., 2017. Web. March 9, 2017.
 "Success Story Spotlight with Gloria Amescua." Writing Barn. N.p., February 17, 2017. Web. March 9, 2017.

External links 
 “Beyond the Ban to Name the Beast: a Conversation with CantoMundo Founders and Fellows:” 
 “Ancestral Migration” by Gloria Amescua

Writers from Austin, Texas
American women poets
American writers of Mexican descent
21st-century American poets
Living people
21st-century American women writers
Poets from Texas
University of Texas at Austin College of Education alumni
Year of birth missing (living people)